The Dorm That Dripped Blood, originally released under the title Pranks, is a 1982 American slasher film directed by Stephen Carpenter and Jeffrey Obrow, written by Carpenter and Stacey Giachino, and starring Laurie Lapinski, Stephen Sachs, David Snow, Pamela Holland, and Daphne Zuniga in her film debut. It follows four college students who stay on campus over the Christmas holiday to clean out a condemned dormitory, where an unknown assailant begins stalking and murdering them.

Filmed on the University of California, Los Angeles campus in December 1981, the film was originally released in the United States and United Kingdom under the title Pranks in 1982. When its distributors found this title non-conducive to box-office sales, the film was re-titled The Dorm That Dripped Blood and re-released in 1983. In the United Kingdom, it suffered significant censorship due to its graphic violence, earning its inclusion on the British Board of Film Classification's "video nasty" list, though it was later removed.

Plot
On a college campus, a young male coed is chased and killed by an unseen assailant. Meanwhile, Joanne and her boyfriend Tim attend a campus party, where they discuss that their dormitory building, Morgan Meadows Hall, has been condemned. Along with friends Brian, Patty, Craig, and Debbie, Joanne is staying behind during the Christmas holiday to help clear out the building for its impending demolition. Tim leaves for a holiday skiing trip the next day, while Debbie reveals that she cannot stay as her parents are picking her up later in the day.

Debbie's parents arrive in the evening and wait for Debbie, who is searching for Joanne's inventory list. Her father gets impatient and leaves the car to find her, only to be bludgeoned by an unseen killer with a baseball bat spiked with nails. Her mother is then strangled in the car with a wire garrote. Debbie finds their bodies and faints in horror. The killer drags Debbie's body behind the car and crushes her head by backing over it, before driving away with all three corpses in the trunk.

The next day, Patty sees a vagrant named John Hemmit near the campus dump site. Later that day, the caretaker, Bill, complains that one of his drills has been stolen, while Joanne muses that John took it. Joanne meets Bobby Lee Tremble, a local salesman who is purchasing some of the tables from the dorm. Not long after, Bill is killed in the bathroom with the stolen drill. The next morning, Craig and Bryan see John walking by the dorm and try to warn him away. The group plays pool that evening, but they are interrupted after Patty sees John peering in at them through a window. Deciding to take matters into their own hands, the group decides to search for John around the building but is unsuccessful in finding him.

The group prepares dinner when Craig notices some of the food is missing and sees John fleeing. While the group searches again for him, the killer smashes their dinner table with the spiked bat. Returning and seeing the mess, they call the police and report John. Later that night, Joanne hears footsteps on the dorm's roof and calls the others to her room when the power cuts out. On his way to the room, Brian encounters someone shining a torch in his face before he is attacked. Patty and Craig make it to Joanne's room, but Bryan does not show up, so Joanne stays behind while Craig and Patty go downstairs to try to reconnect the power. In the kitchen, they get separated, and Patty is grabbed from behind and knocked unconscious by the killer, who then drops her into an industrial pressure cooker and closes the lid.

Craig makes it back to Joanne's room, claiming he was knocked unconscious and that he cannot find Patty anywhere. John eventually corners Joanne while she discovers Brian's mutilated corpse in a storage room. She flees from him and makes it back to Craig. The two team up and manage to kill John. At this point, Craig reveals that he was in fact the killer all along, and that John knew and was trying to warn Joanne. After being chased by Craig, Joanne is shown the corpses of Patty, Debbie, and her family. Craig explains that he loves her and got rid of anyone who clung to her or ruined his chances of being with her.

Joanne attempts to flee again when Bobby appears. Craig knocks Joanne unconscious before being cornered by Bobby. The police arrive, and believe Bobby is the prowler the group had reported and shoot him down when he attempts to kill Craig. The police leave to obtain reinforcements and medical help, while Craig resolves to kill Joanne. With Joanne still unconscious, Craig dumps her body into an incinerator and seemingly escapes, while the police outside wonder if the smoke emanating from the incinerator exhaust vent should smell so bad.

Cast

Production

Conception and casting
Inspired by Friday the 13th, Stephen Carpenter co-wrote the script with Stacey Giachino while films students at the University of California, Los Angeles. The original title of the film was The Third Night, and later became Death Dorm after the production wrapped. To secure funding for the film, Obrow and Carpenter shot footage for a pre-emptive promotional trailer in order to pitch the film to investors.

Casting was done by Obrow and Carpenter independent of a casting director, as they could not afford to hire one. In the film, the casting director is credited as "Wesley Lou David", which is an amalgam of the directors' and producers' middles names.

Filming
The film was shot primarily on the UCLA campus in and around the film school building, and in the University Cooperative Housing Association The cinematography was completed using the university's equipment, and the film was shot primarily on handheld Eclair cameras on 16 mm film, which had to subsequently be blown up to 35 mm.

As it is set, the bulk of the film was shot over Christmas vacation at the university over a period of around three weeks in December 1980 and January 1981, and additional photography was completed over the ensuing six months.

Release

Censorship
To avoid an X rating, the film was cut substantially by the MPAA in the United States, and by the British Board of Film Classification (BBFC) in the United Kingdom, with portions of the murder scenes truncated or nearly edited out entirely. The murder scene of Debbie's father with the spiked baseball bat was significantly trimmed down to show only one or two blows to the head, and the footage of the maintenance man being drilled through the head with the power drill was excised entirely.

Upon the film's release in the United Kingdom (under the title Pranks), it was deemed a video nasty, which Carpenter and Obrow surmise was due to the graphic drill murder sequence, and for the cover artwork which depicted the spiked baseball bat. It was assumed that the BBFC had worries that, because the killing weapon was depicted clearly, it was imitable. However, the film was not successfully prosecuted and was removed from the list. It was eventually re-released on video in 1992 with ten seconds of cuts to the aforementioned drill murder.

Theatrical distribution
In the United States, the film was released by its distributor under the title Pranks on September 10, 1982 in several U.S. cities, including Atlanta and Indianapolis. This title was altered from Carpenter and Obrow's original title, Death Dorm. After the distributors found the title unsatisfactory and non-conducive to box office sales, the film was re-released as The Dorm That Dripped Blood on July 15, 1983 in Baltimore and later expanded that fall to 40 U.S. theaters on September 23, 1983. During this secondary expanded theatrical run, the film grossed a total of $215,000. In the United Kingdom, it was released exclusively under the Pranks title through New Line Cinema.

Critical reception 
Critic Stephen Hunter, writing for the Baltimore Sun, compared the film unfavorably against other slasher films of the time, noting that, "even featuring nine grisly killings...  the film is almost energy-less."

In a retrospective assessment of the film, journalist Jim Harper called the film "one of the best of the low budget eighties slashers. Even though the material is pretty derivative, the direction shows promise, and the script could have been a lot worse". Film journalist Adam Rockoff gave the film a negative assessment, calling it a "bland and uninspired slasher", adding: "The Dorm That Dripped Blood attempts one meager stab at originality by killing off the Final Girl in the film's last scene. This unnecessary, downbeat ending is actually a relief, for it signals not only an end to her annoying self-righteousness, but to the film as a whole". Gene Siskel picked it as one of his "Dogs of the Week" for a 1982 "Sneak Previews" show, declaring it to be another "women in danger" slasher piece of garbage.

The Dorm That Dripped Blood holds an approval rating of 0% on movie review aggregator website Rotten Tomatoes, based on five critic reviews.

Cavett Binion of AllMovie qualified it as a "derivative slasher clone", awarding it 1.5 out of 5 stars. TV Guide awarded the film 1 out of a possible 5 stars, calling it "utterly predictable and full of infuriating red herrings".
Horror film review website Oh, the Horror! criticized the film's writing, direction, and "abysmal" acting but complimented the film's score and gore effects. Film scholar John Stanley, in Creature Features: The Science Fiction, Fantasy, and Horror Movie Guide (2000), awarded the film one out of five stars.

Home media
The film was released on DVD in the United States by Eclectic DVD Distribution on December 2, 2003 under its original title, Pranks. On April 26, 2011, Synapse Films released a Blu-ray-DVD combination set of the film under its better-known title, The Dorm That Dripped Blood. This Blu-ray release features the original 88-minute uncensored directors' cut, featuring the title card of Death Dorm, that had previously never been seen by the public, featuring additional and extended gore and exposition sequences.

See also

 List of films with a 0% rating on Rotten Tomatoes
 Video nasty

Notes

References

Sources

External links

1982 films
1982 directorial debut films
1982 horror films
1982 independent films
Abandoned buildings and structures in fiction
American horror thriller films
American teen horror films
American independent films
American slasher films
American Christmas horror films
American mystery horror films
American student films
Films about fratricide and sororicide
Films about mass murder
Films about stalking
Films directed by Jeffrey Obrow
Films directed by Stephen Carpenter
Films scored by Christopher Young
Films set in abandoned buildings and structures
Films set in universities and colleges
Films shot in Los Angeles
Obscenity controversies in film
Video nasties
1980s American films
1980s Christmas horror films
1980s English-language films
1980s horror thriller films
1980s mystery films
1980s slasher films
1980s teen horror films